Truckee Meadows Community College (TMCC) is a public community college and technical college in the Truckee Meadows of Reno, Nevada. The college is primarily a commuter campus  with 5 locations. TMCC offers students both certificate and associate degrees. In 2015, TMCC was approved to offer two Bachelor of Applied Science degrees, one in Logistics Operations Management and the other in Emergency Management and Homeland Security.

From 1971 to 1979, the college was a branch of Western Nevada Community College. Its current name is based on its primary service area, Truckee Meadows in Reno and Sparks. The college has more than 500 faculty members and is accredited by the Northwest Commission on College and Universities. The college serves more than 13,000 students each semester in state-supported classes. TMCC is regionally accredited by the Northwest Commission on Colleges and Universities.

Academics
The college offers a university-transfer program and a wide variety of occupational and applied technical programs, including a large number of developmental courses, particularly in mathematics and English to prepare students to take university transfer courses. Starting in the 1980s, the student demand for courses and programs created a need for more facilities. In addition to expanding the Dandini Campus, the college established the William N. Pennington Applied Technology Center (March 1999), Meadowood Center (February 2003), the Nell J. Redfield Foundation Performing Arts Center (September 2003) and the William N. Pennington Health Science Center, located at the Redfield Campus (September 2005).

The college offers degrees and certificates in 50 programs of study. Popular programs include: Health Professions and Related Programs, Liberal Arts and Sciences, General Studies and Humanities, and Science Technologies/Technicians. The college also offers a Bachelor's of Applied Science degree in Emergency Management and Homeland Security and Logistical Operations Management.

References

External links
 

1971 establishments in Nevada
Buildings and structures in Reno, Nevada
Education in Washoe County, Nevada
Educational institutions established in 1971
Nevada System of Higher Education
Two-year colleges in the United States
Universities and colleges accredited by the Northwest Commission on Colleges and Universities
Community colleges in Nevada